White Sage Flat is a flat in Elko County, Nevada and Tooele County, Utah.

It extends westward into Elko County, Nevada at  It lies east of the Antelope Valley badlands, and it lies just south and southeast of Ferber Peak.

References 

Landforms of Elko County, Nevada
Landforms of Tooele County, Utah